Flypaper is a 1999 crime film starring Craig Sheffer, Robert Loggia, Sadie Frost, Talisa Soto and Lucy Liu. It was written and directed by Klaus Hoch.

Greed, lust and fate bring together a motley collection of oddballs and lowlifes for some rather sticky situations in Hoch's twisted neo-noir debut. Three separate but interconnected stories, all set on a deceptively sunny day in California and centered on one million dollars in cash, inspire Hoch's quirky characters to commit acts both devious and depraved in an attempt to make the big score.

External links

1990s crime films
American crime comedy films
1990s English-language films
1990s American films